Nabil Jaadi (born 1 July 1996) is a Belgium-born Moroccan footballer who plays as a forward.

Career
On 30 January 2018, Jaadi will continue his career at the Super League One club Asteras Tripoli on loan until the summer of 2018. The 21-year-old Belgian-Moroccan international has also been a member of Anderlecht , Latina, Granada B, Ascoli and  Olhanense in the past, while he will replace Ivorian striker Cedric Gondo in the current squad of experienced manager Savvas Pantelidis' team.

On 21 February 2019, he joined Romanian side Dinamo București. He left Dinamo in August 2019.

Personal life
Jaadi was born in Belgium and is of Moroccan descent. Nabil is the brother of the Belgian footballer Reda Jaadi. He has also represented the Belgian and Moroccan national youth teams.

References

External links

International statistics at FIFA

1996 births
Living people
Footballers from Brussels
Belgian sportspeople of Moroccan descent
Belgian footballers
Belgium youth international footballers
Moroccan footballers
Morocco under-20 international footballers
Association football forwards
Belgian Pro League players
Serie A players
Serie B players
Segunda División B players
Liga Portugal 2 players
Super League Greece players
Liga I players
R.S.C. Anderlecht players
Udinese Calcio players
Latina Calcio 1932 players
Club Recreativo Granada players
Ascoli Calcio 1898 F.C. players
S.C. Olhanense players
Asteras Tripolis F.C. players
FC Dinamo București players
Belgian expatriate footballers
Moroccan expatriate footballers
Belgian expatriate sportspeople in Italy
Moroccan expatriate sportspeople in Italy
Expatriate footballers in Italy
Belgian expatriate sportspeople in Spain
Moroccan expatriate sportspeople in Spain
Expatriate footballers in Spain
Belgian expatriate sportspeople in Portugal
Moroccan expatriate sportspeople in Portugal
Expatriate footballers in Portugal
Belgian expatriate sportspeople in Greece
Moroccan expatriate sportspeople in Greece
Expatriate footballers in Greece
Belgian expatriate sportspeople in Romania
Moroccan expatriate sportspeople in Romania
Expatriate footballers in Romania